Joie De Vivre is an American emo band from Rockford, Illinois, United States.

History 
Joie De Vivre formed in 2007. Since then, they have released two full-length albums, an EP, and several splits. The band temporarily broke up in 2011, during which time they finished their sophomore album, We're All Better Than This. Following completion of the album, the band reunited in 2012 and completed a tour of Europe in June / July 2012. Since 2012, they have released two splits, one with Empire! Empire! (I Was a Lonely Estate) and Prawn. While still an active band since 2012, they've limited their activity to spot shows around the Midwest.

Band members 
Current members
Brandon Lutmer (vocals, bass)
Patrick Delehanty (guitar)
Stewart Oakes (drums)
Mark Jaeschke (trumpet)
Warren Franklin (guitar)

Former members
Chris French (guitar)
Steven Kurzac (drums)
Paul Karnatz (cornet, mellophone)
Zach Staas (organ)
Geoff Schott (guitar)

Discography 
Studio albums
The North End (2010)
We're All Better Than This (2012)

EPs
Summer Months (2009)

Splits
Empire! Empire! (I Was a Lonely Estate) / Joie De Vivre (2014)
Joie De Vivre / Prawn (2014)
Joie De Vivre / The Please & Thank Yous / Emo Side Project (2012)
Annabel / Empire! Empire! (I Was a Lonely Estate) / Joie De Vivre / The Reptilian (2011)
Joie De Vivre / Sleep Bellum Sonno (2011)

Compilations
Breaking Up With (2011)

References

External links 
 

Emo musical groups from Illinois
Emo revival groups
Indie rock musical groups from Illinois
Musicians from Rockford, Illinois
Topshelf Records artists
Count Your Lucky Stars Records artists
Musical groups established in 2007